The Schöneberger Sängerknaben were a German boys' choir from Berlin, named after the . The choir performed with about 30 boys at a time. They wore short black trousers, black blazers with emblems, white shirts and white knee socks. The repertoire initially included German folk songs, Berlin popular songs and Schlager, later also opera choruses and other classical works.

Career 
The Schöneberger Sängerknaben was founded by Gerhard Hellwig on 12 November 1947. Hellwig trained the boys and initially sang with them in old people's homes, hospitals and in Berlin squares. Only two years after its foundation, the then manager of the Deutsche Oper Berlin, Heinz Tietjen, brought the choir into his house and engaged it for the performance of the opera Tannhäuser by Richard Wagner. This was the prelude to more than 3100 opera performances in over 50 different productions in several languages, including, from 1954, the Bayreuth Festival, whose artistic organisation office Gerhard Hellwig headed from 1959.

Five years later, the choir accompanied the singer Bully Buhlan on his song Junge Herzen haben Sehnsucht, the song of the ARD television lottery in 1963. The versatile choir, which among other things recorded an LP with Manuela with songs from fairy tale land, was featured in numerous television events.

In addition to its many performances and engagements, the choir has also undertaken over 300 concert tours, taking it to many countries in Europe and overseas, including the  Montreal Expo 67 in 1967.

Dissolution of the choir 
Gerhard Hellwig passed away on 15 January 2011. With his death, the Schöneberger Sängerknaben also ceased their work.

Successful titles 
 Auf Wiedersehen
 Pack die Badehose ein with Cornelia Froboess
 Berliner Jungens, die sind richtig
 Unsere Stadt hört doch nicht am Brandenburger Tor auf

Recordings 
Albums (selection):
 Weiße Weihnacht 1975 (together with the Berliner Kammerchor, large Berlin Symphony Orchestra and organ, recorded in the Rosary Basilica (Berlin), Berlin-Steglitz)
 Deutsche Volkslieder (with Richard Clayderman) 1988
 Gruß an Potsdam 1992
 Wir wollen Freunde sein – 50 Jahre Schöneberger Sängerknaben 1997
 Mach auf dein Herz zur Weihnachtszeit – Fröhliche Weihnachten with the Schöneberger Sängerknaben
 Man muss mal ab und zu verreisen 2004
 Berliner Jungens, die sind richtig 2004
 Soundtrack: „Für immer Immenhof“, Bear-Family BCD 16644 AS, with the music from the first three Immenhof films, partly sung by the choir
 Henze: Der junge Lord, with Edith Mathis (Luise); Donald Grobe (Wilhelm), Barry McDaniel (Secretary of Sir Edgar), Loren Driscoll (Lord Barrat), Ruth Hesse (Frau von Hufnagel) und Vera Little (Begonia); Orchestra and choir of the Deutsche Oper Berlin and the Schöneberger Sängerknaben, conductor: Christoph von Dohnányi (in the world premiere production of Gustav Rudolf Sellner), Deutsche Grammophon 449 875-2 (double-CD) / Medici Arts 2072398 (DVD) 1967

References

External links 

 
 

German choirs
Musical groups from Berlin
1947 establishments in Germany
2011 disestablishments in Germany